Constant Madtoingué (born 23 September 1994) is a Chadian football defender and the member of Chad national football team. He has 16 FIFA official caps for national team, and he is a part of qualifying campaign for 2021 Africa Cup of Nations.

International career 

Constant debuted in a friendly match against Equatorial Guinea in February 2011. Soon after that, he played a 2012 Africa Cup of Nations qualification match against Botswana, which Chad lost 0-1 in N'Djamena. He was part of the team that won CEMAC 2014. He has 7 unofficial caps for Chad as well.

See also 
 List of Chad international footballers

References

External links 

1987 births
Living people
Chadian footballers
Chad international footballers
Place of birth missing (living people)
Association football defenders